Dupuy de Lôme (A759), named after the 19th century engineer Henri Dupuy de Lôme, is a ship designed for the collection of signals and communications beyond enemy lines, which entered the service of the French Navy in April 2006. In contrast to Bougainville, the ship that she replaced, Dupuy de Lôme was specifically designed for sea intelligence, pursuant to the MINREM project (Moyen Interarmées Naval de Recherche ElectroMagnétique, "Joint Naval Resources for Electromagnetic Research").

Design and description

Dupuy de Lôme was designed and built by Royal Niestern Sander shipyards in Delfzijl, The Netherlands with yard number 816. The Thales Naval France designed the electromagnetic intelligence part of the vessel.
She provides a 350-day-operational availability a year, out of which 240 can be spent at sea. The ship is operated by two naval crews, each composed of thirty-three sailors and another thirty-three technicians, and an optional complement of up to thirty-eight specialists, depending on the mission. The specialised personnel operates under the Direction du renseignement militaire.

Construction and career

In October 2021, during rising tensions between China and Taiwan, France confirmed that Dupuy de Lôme had been present in the Taiwan Strait recently, having been last seen sailing from Japan on 1 October 2021. As of July 2022, it was berthed in Bergen, Norway.

References

Other sources

 Dupuy de Lôme, Ministry of Defence
 Navire collecteur de renseignements Dupuy de Lôme, netmarine.net

Auxiliary ships of France
Electronic intelligence ships
2004 ships